S. Xavier (1920 - 6 December 2009) was a lawyer, trade union leader and Swatantra party politician from the Indian state of Tamil Nadu. He served as the Member of Lok Sabha for Tirunelveli from 1967 to 1971 and expired on 6 December 2009.

Early life
Xavier was born in the year 1920. He graduated in 1941 and entered government service the very same year. He studied law and graduated as a lawyer in 1952 and started practising from 1953 onwards. Xavier lead various trade unions and worker's organisations in Madras state.

Politics
Xavier took an active interest in politics and joined the Swatantra party established by C. Rajagopalachari in 1959. He contested in the 1967 elections from Tirunelveli and was elected to the Lok Sabha.

Notes

References
 

1920 births
2009 deaths
Lok Sabha members from Tamil Nadu
Tamil Nadu politicians
Swatantra Party politicians
India MPs 1967–1970
People from Tirunelveli district